The Fortress Wall of Seoul (Hanja: 서울 漢陽都城; Hangul: 서울 한양도성;), or literally the Seoul City Wall is a series of walls made of stone, wood and other materials, built to protect the city of Seoul against invaders. The wall was first built in 1396 to defend and show the boundaries of the city, surrounding Hanyang (Hanja: 漢陽; Hangul: 한양 the old name for Seoul) in the Joseon Dynasty. At that time, it was called Hansung (Hanja: 漢城; Hangul: 한성). The wall stretches 18.6 km along the ridge of Seoul's four inner mountains, Bugaksan, Inwangsan, Naksan and Namsan. At present, a 12-km section of the wall is designated as Historic Site No. 10 (1963) and is protected accordingly, along with the gates, water gates, and signal fire mounds. The northern, eastern, and southern sections of Mt.Nam (Namsan section) walls have undergone extensive restoration work, having sustained damage or been entirely destroyed during Japanese imperial rule (1910–1945).

Castellation
In 1395, just five years after King Taejo founded the Joseon Dynasty, King Taejo established a government office [Doseongchukjoedogam (Hanja: 都城築造都監; Hangul: 도성축조도감)] to build a castle to defend Seoul. He ordered Jeong Do-jeon to search for and measure a site.

On 1 January 1396 (by the lunar calendar), Taejo of Joseon held the groundbreaking ceremony. 197,400 young men were placed under civil conscription over two years and completed building the castle 98 days after the war along the mountains Bugaksan, Naksan, Namsan, and Inwangsan. The wall contained eight gates, all of which were originally constructed between 1396 and 1398.

Characteristics

The original walls, built in the late 14th century were constructed of medium-sized round stones held together by mud. During King Sejong the Great's reign in the mid-15th century, a large-scale refurbishment work was carried out on the wall, including the replacement of earthen wall sections with rectangular stone sections. A major restoration in 1704 by King Sukjong rebuilt sections of the wall using large, uniform stone slabs which mark the final and last unique characteristic of Hanyangdoseong.

The eastern section of Seoul was on lower ground than the other sections and was more susceptible to external attack. Thus, a lookout was added to the outside of the gate to reinforce its defense. A part of the walls in the section between Heunginjimun and Gwanghuimun was extended outside in a rectangular shape for such a purpose. Signal fire mounds, another component of the defense system, were first established in 1394 and remained in operation until 1894. Signals sent across the country from one mound to another, using smoke by day and fire at night, were received by the beacon at the top of Namsan and conveyed to the Royal Palace.

Gates

Four main gates and four auxiliary gates were built around Seoul in the late 14th century. The four main gates were Heunginjimun (East Gate), Donuimun (West Gate), Sungnyemun (South Gate), and Sukjeongmun (North Gate). The four auxiliary gates were placed in areas between the four main gates, with Souimun (in the southwest), Changuimun (in the northwest), Hyehwamun (in the northeast), and Gwanghuimun (in the southeast).

At present, the following gates are either preserved in their original form or have undergone restoration work: Sungnyemun (South Gate) and Heunginjimun (East Gate) are designated as National Treasure No. 1 and Treasure No. 1, respectively.

Condition

Hanyangdoseong, completed in 30 years, was torn down in many parts due to city planning initiatives and the introduction of trams lines. However, significant sections of the wall remain. The best-preserved and well-known course is the Wall of Mt. Bukaksan, the 2.3-km trail which cuts through Sukjeongmun to Changuimun. Previously off-limits to the public after having been designated as a Military Reserve area due to its close proximity to Cheongwadae, it opened to the public in 2006. With very few alterations or artificial structures surrounding the area over the years, the natural environment remains relatively intact.

Trail tour
The city of Seoul operates the Hanyangdoseong stamp trail tour, which runs along the wall, divided into six trails:
Baegak Mountain Trail
Naksan Mountain Trail
Heunginjimun Gate Trail
Namsan(Mongmyeoksan) Mountain Trail
Sungnyemun Gate Trail
Inwangsan Mountain Trail

Gallery

See also 
 The Eight Gates of Seoul

Notes

References
 Korean Exploring Online
Fortress Wall of Seoul Korean Britannica Online

Buildings and structures completed in 1396
History of Seoul
Buildings and structures in Seoul
Tourist attractions in Seoul
Castles in South Korea
Seoul
Historic Sites of South Korea
World Heritage Tentative List